Mildred may refer to:

People
 Mildred (name), a given name (including a list of people and characters with the name)
 Saint Mildrith, 8th-century Abbess of Minster-in-Thanet
 Milred (died 774), Anglo-Saxon prelate, Bishop of Worcester
 Henry Mildred (1795–1877), South Australian politician
 Henry Hay Mildred (1839–1920), a son of Henry Mildred, lawyer and politician

Places
Canada
Mildred River, a tributary of La Trêve Lake in Québec

United States
 Mildred, Kansas
 Mildred, Minnesota
 Mildred, Missouri
 Mildred, Pennsylvania
 Mildred, Texas

Other uses
 Mildred, a barquentine shipwrecked at Gurnard's Head in 1912 (see list of shipwrecks in 1912)